Metioche vittaticollis, the silent leaf-runner cricket or silent leaf runner, is a species of  cricket in the genus Metioche.
The species is 10 mm long. It feeds on little insects like planthoppers and leafhoppers.

References

Crickets
Trigonidiinae
Insects described in 1861